Kosovo field is a large karst field, located in the middle part of Kosovo. It is mostly known for being the site of the Battle of Kosovo (1389) between the Balkan Alliance led by Lazar of Serbia and Ottoman armies led by Murad I, and many other battles.

Geography
The large karst field is directed northwest–south. The plain stretches from Mitrovica southwards including Obiliq, Kosovo Polje (which lies in the centre), Lipjan, and almost to Kaçanik. The region of Kosovo stretches roughly from Ferizaj to Vushtrri.

It is situated 500–600 m above sea level.

In the central part, to the west, is the Drenica valley.

History

Medieval

The region was an economic hub of the early Eastern Roman Empire in the province of Dardania. Praevalitana (the region before the valley), a province that bordered Dardania was named after the fact that it was located directly to the west of the field. A reference to the field may appear in the early Christian cult of Florus and Laurus of the fourth century AD, which was recorded no earlier than the sixth century AD. In the recorded version in Constantinople, the geographical location of Ulpiana, which was a settlement in the field of Kosovo, is described in Greek as Eucharis Koilas (the Gracious Valley).

The Kosovo field was the site of the Battle of Kosovo in June 1389, the battlefield northwest of Prishtina where an army led by Prince Lazar of Serbia fought the Ottoman army. It is for this field, and the battle, that the Kosovo region and contemporary Kosovo, and in turn the historical Kosovo Vilayet and Yugoslav Kosovo and Metohija is named. The modern city of Fushë Kosovë is also named after the field.

Serbian ruler Stefan Lazarević (1389–1427) erected a marble column with inscriptions on the field, in memory of his father.

The Second Battle of Kosovo was fought between the Ottoman Empire and Kingdom of Hungary in 1448.

The Ottoman cadastral tax census (defter) of 1455 in the District of Branković took place in the Kosovo field which is in a part of eastern Kosovo

Modern history

In 1877, the Kosovo Vilayet was established by the Ottoman Empire a first-level administrative division. This area included the absolute majority of the modern Kosovo.

During World War I, the Serbian army retreated to the Kosovo plain by November 1915. Then, under attack from both sides, the army withdrew across the mountains into Albania.

See also
Llap (region)

References

Military history of Albania
Military history of Serbia
Plains of Kosovo
Historical regions in Kosovo